The 2007 Copa do Brasil de Futebol Feminino  was the first staging of the competition and was played from October 30 to December 9, 2007. 32 clubs of all regions of Brazil participated of the cup, which was organized by the Brazilian Football Confederation (CBF). The champion was Mato Grosso do Sul/Saad.

Competition format

32 clubs, selected by their respective state federations, participated of the Copa do Brasil de Futebol Feminino 2007.

The 32 clubs were divided in 6 pools (A/B/C/D/E/F), according to their regions.
 A and B: North and Northeast regions
 C: Central-West region
 D: Southern region
 E and F: Southeast region

The first three stages were two-legged knockout matches, but the clubs of the groups C, D, E and F did not play the third stage. The winners of each pool plus the two clubs with the best record among the third stage eliminated teams of the groups 22, 23 and 24, and 25 and 26 qualified to the fourth stage.

In the fourth stage, the four teams were divided in two groups of four teams each, playing against the other teams of their groups once. The matches were played at Mané Garrincha, Brasília and Boca do Jacaré, Taguatinga, Distrito Federal.

The two best clubs of each group qualified to the semifinals, and the semifinals winners played the final on December 9, at Estádio Mané Garrincha, Brasília.

Ranking criteria
If the teams were level on points, they were ranked on the following criteria in order:

 Greatest total goal difference; 
 Greatest number of goals scored as a visitor;. 
 Penalty shootout.

Participating teams
The 2007 participating teams were the following clubs:

AJA
Santos
Botucatu
America
Vasco
Juventude
Internacional
Nacional
Benfica
São José
Sport Recife
São Francisco do Conde
Aliança
Scorpions
Horizonte
Independente
CESMAC
ABC
Internacional
Desportiva Capixaba
CRESSPOM
Rio Negro
Mato Grosso do Sul/Saad
River Plate
CEPE
Tiradentes
Mixto
Andirá
Genus
Gurupi
Rio Norte
Baré

Table

First stage
references: 

¹ Internacional qualified due to the away goals rule.

Second stage

Third stage

References:

Fourth stage

Group 27

(*) America qualified to the fourth stage because it had the best record among the third stage eliminated teams of the groups 22, 23 and 24.

Group 28

(*) Tiradentes qualified to the fourth stage because it had the best record among the third stage eliminated teams of the groups 25 and 26.

Final stage

Semifinals

Third-place playoff

Final

References

External links
 CBF
 CBF - Match information

2007
Copa Do Brasil
Copa Do Brasil De Futebol Feminino, 2007